In 1948, the new Romanian Communist regime undertook a political purge of the members of the Romanian Academy. In all, 113 members were removed that June, representing over two-thirds of the total membership at the beginning of the year. Fifty-five members of the "old" academy, mainly scientists, were admitted into the "new" one. In 1990 and 1994, following the Romanian Revolution, 97 of the purged members were restored to the academy, post-mortem. This list presents the names of the purged members, along with the names of those who died in prison and those who spent time in prison.

Purged members (113)

Titular members (26)

Literature section (8)

History section (14)

Sciences section (4)

Corresponding members (58)

Literature section (20)

History section (19)

Sciences section (19)

Honorary members (29)

Purged members who died in prison (9)

Purged members who were incarcerated (30)

Notes

References
 Păun Otiman, "1948 - Anul imensei jertfe a Academiei Române", in Academica, Nr. 4 (31), December 2013, p.115-124

Purged
Academicians, purged
1948 in Romania
Political and cultural purges
Socialist Republic of Romania